Grevillea candicans is a species of flowering plant in the family Proteaceae and is endemic to the south-west of Western Australia. It is a bushy shrub with pinnately-divided leaves with sharply-pointed linear lobes, and cream-coloured flowers.

Description
The lower surface of the leaves has two hairy grooves.

Taxonomy
Grevillea candicans was first formally described in 1942 by Charles Gardner in the Journal of the Royal Society of Western Australia from specimens collected by William Blackall. The specific epithet (candicans) means "becoming white or whitish".

Distribution and habitat
This grevillea grows in sandy soil in open shrubland or woodland from near Geraldton to the Murchison River with an isolated population east of Dalwallinu, in the Avon Wheatbelt, Geraldton Sandplains and Yalgoo biogeographic regions of south-western Western Australia.

Conservation status
Grevillea candicans is listed as "Priority Three" by the Government of Western Australia Department of Biodiversity, Conservation and Attractions, meaning that it is poorly known and known from only a few locations but is not under imminent threat.

References

candicans
Eudicots of Western Australia
Proteales of Australia
Taxa named by Charles Gardner
Plants described in 1943